Rai-Sankli is a village and former petty princely state on Saurashtra peninsula in Gujarat, western India.

History
The Sixth Class princely state in Jhalawar prant was ruled by (rare) Kunbi Chieftains. It also comprised a second village.

In 1901 it has a population of 427, yielding a state revenue of 6,579 Rupees (1903-4, nearly all from land), paying a 938 Rupees tribute to the British and the Gaekwar Baroda State.

Rulers

The rulers of Rai-Sankli were titled 'Amin Shree'. The rulers belonged to chavda clan of Mansa state Trikamji Chavda son of King Raolji Rajsinhji Chavda Married to daughter of Ruler of Rai-Sankli and later became successor of Rai-Sankli and accepted as Kunbi. Rai-Sankli rulers also ruled Hasan Nagar estate.

Amin Shreejis

1905 – 1945 Trikamji Rajsinhji (b. 1880 - d. 1945)
1945 – 1988 Tryambakchandraji Trikamji (b. 1912 - d. 1988)
1988 – 2012 Jagdish Chandra ji Tryambakchanraji (b. 1935 - d. 2012) 
2012 - Present RaniSaheba YoginaDeviji Jagdish Chandra ji (b. 1968 - present) 
Current heir apparent is Kumari shri RichaKumariji 

The Rulers of Princely State of Rai-Sankli and  Hasan Nagar estate were the very first to join to union of India. They faced trouble from British rulers for being freedom supporter and secular.

External links
 Imperial Gazetteer on dsal.uchicago.edu - Kathiawar

Princely states of Gujarat